The Ranfurly Shield, colloquially known as the Log o' Wood, is a trophy in New Zealand's domestic rugby union competition. First played for in 1904, the Ranfurly Shield is based on a challenge system, rather than a league or knockout competition as with most football trophies. The holding union must defend the Shield in challenge matches, and if a challenger defeats them, they become the new holder of the Shield.

Canterbury began the decade as shield holders, and held it two separate times throughout the 1970s. Marlborough notably won their first shield challenge in 1973, and held it for six successful defences before losing it to South Canterbury.

Fixtures

1970

1971

1972

1973

1974

1975

1976

1977

1978

1979

External links
https://www.provincial.rugby/ranfurly-shield/
https://www.rugbyhistory.co.nz/ranfurly-shield

References

Ranfurly Shield
Rugby union trophies and awards
New Zealand rugby union competitions
1970 in New Zealand rugby union
1971 in New Zealand rugby union
1972 in New Zealand rugby union
1973 in New Zealand rugby union
1974 in New Zealand rugby union
1975 in New Zealand rugby union
1976 in New Zealand rugby union
1977 in New Zealand rugby union
1978 in New Zealand rugby union
1979 in New Zealand rugby union